Thinking may also refer to:

Thinking (poem), by Walter D. Wintle

Music
 "Thinking" (album), studio album by Zico 2019
"Thinking" (song), single by Roger Daltrey 1973
"Thinkin'", song and single by Jesse Lee Turner 1960
"Thinkin'", song by The Corsairs 1961
"Thinkin'", song by Compost from Compost (album) 1971
"Thinkin'", song by Ronnie Wood from Slide on This 1992
"Thinkin'", song by Steve Forbert from Alive on Arrival 1978
"Thinkin'", song by Apathy from Wanna Snuggle? 2009
"Thinkin'", song by 3T
"Thinkin'", song by Miley Cyrus from Younger Now 2017